Lapland may refer to:

Places 
Lapland or Sápmi, an ethno-cultural region stretching over northern Fennoscandia (parts of Norway, Sweden, Finland, and Russia)
Lapland (Finland) (Lappi/Lappland), a Finnish region
Lapland (former province of Finland) (Lappi/Lappland), a province of Finland 1938–2009
Lapland (constituency), a constituency in Finland
Lapland (Norway), an incorrect designation for Finnmǫrk; see 
Lapland (Sweden) (Lappland), a Swedish historical province
Russian Lapland, a former name and a sporadic marketing term for Murmansk Oblast
Laplandiya, a rural locality (a railway station) in Murmansk Oblast
Lapland, Indiana, a town in the United States
Lapland, Kansas, an unincorporated community in the United States
Lapland, Nova Scotia, a community in Lunenburg district, Nova Scotia, Canada
Lappi (meaning "Lapland"), a district in Tampere, Finland

Television, film, and music
Lapland, the former name of the BBC television series now titled Being Eileen
Lapland (album), a 2005 album by Craig Wedren
"Lapland", a song on the 2004 album Ratatat by Ratatat
"Lapland (Lappi)", a suite on the 1997 album Angels Fall First by Nightwish
Lapland (film), a 1957 Disney film directed by Ben Sharpsteen

Other 
Lapland Biosphere Reserve, a natural reserve in Murmansk Oblast
Lapland War, a war between Finland and Nazi Germany in 1944–45
SS Lapland, a large ocean liner of the Red Star Line that served from 1908 to 1934

See also

 
 Lappland (disambiguation)
 Land (disambiguation)
 Lap (disambiguation)

Divided regions